Builsa is a town in the Builsa District of the Upper East Region of Ghana. The capital of Bulsa North District is Sandema, of Bulsa South District Fumbisi; other villages/towns are Wiaga, Fumbisi, Kanjaga, Gbedema, Siniensi, Kadema and Chuchuliga.

Builsa Tribe 
The Bulsa or Builsa people, who are sometimes wrongly called the Kanjaga, are agricultural and pastoral Oti-Volta speaking people who live in the Builsa Districts of the Upper East Region. Bulsa and indigenous Koma peoples live in the Savanna land along the Kulpawn and Sisil Rivers' confluence. Sandema is the area's main town and the paramountcy's seat.

Bulsa are believed to be the descendants of a Mampurusi prince named Atuga from Nalerigu, a Gur-speaking Kasena blacksmith (feok) named Akana from Kurugu near Dakai in Burkina Faso who built Kanjag Pung (tanggbain), and some indigenous Koma people [kom dem, people of Kom] whom both Atuga and Akana met on the land.

Bulsa are largely identical to the other peoples of the Region, such as the Kasena and Nankana, with whom they share territories and with those intermarriages are prevalent. A Bulsa is a person from the Bulsa area, not a Kanjaga, as many Ghanaians and the colonialists wrongly identified them with.

Language 
The Builsa people speak Buli as their native language. In most oral circumstances, it is employed. It was rarely used for reading and writing until recently because there were few materials available and few people who possessed these skills. It shares linguistic similarities with Mampruli and Konni.

Konni appears to be the most similar, but little study has been done on him. Buli has some origins with Frafra, although his vocabulary is nothing like Frafra's. There are some grammatical parallels, but there are also some significant differences.

Basic Buli Greetings 
Greeting       Buli             Response

Morning        Selouk        SeloukNalo

Afternoon     Kantweng        KantwengNaloung

Evening        Djunoi         DjunoiNaloung

References

Further reading
 Agalic, James. “Story-Telling among the Bulsa of Northern Ghana”. In: Zeitschrift Für Ethnologie 103, no. 2 (1978): 261–78. http://www.jstor.org/stable/25841665.
 Schott, Rüdiger. "The rebellious girl who wants the perfect man: role assignments in folktales of the bulsa in Northern Ghana". In: Revista ELON. 05 (1999). pp. 121–136.

Populated places in the Upper East Region